The 1938 Ottawa Rough Riders finished in 1st place in the Interprovincial Rugby Football Union with a 5–1 record, but lost in the IRFU Finals to the Toronto Argonauts.

Regular season

Standings

Schedule

Postseason

References

Ottawa Rough Riders seasons